"Back Street Girl" is a song by the English rock band the Rolling Stones written by Mick Jagger and Keith Richards. It first appeared on the UK version of their 1967 album Between the Buttons but was not included on the US version. It was first released in the US on the 1967 album Flowers.

Rolling Stone magazine, in their 100 Greatest Rolling Stones Songs article named "Back Street Girl" at number 85. Mick Jagger in an interview with Rolling Stone in 1968 was asked how he felt about Between the Buttons. Of the album, he said: "I don't know, it just isn't any good. "Back Street Girl" is about the only [song] I like."

The song is a waltz which showcases Brian Jones playing vibraphone and Rolling Stones contributor Jack Nitzsche on the harpsichord. Accordion was played by Nick de Caro.

Personnel

According to authors Philippe Margotin and Jean-Michel Guesdon:

The Rolling Stones
Mick Jagger vocals
Keith Richards acoustic guitar
Brian Jones keyboard
Bill Wyman bass
Charlie Watts bell, castanets

Additional musicians
Nick de Caro accordion

Notes

References

Sources

 

The Rolling Stones songs
1967 songs
Songs written by Jagger–Richards
Song recordings produced by Andrew Loog Oldham
Songs about infidelity